This is a list of Nigerian films released in 1996.

Films

See also 

 List of Nigerian films

References

External links 

 1996 films at the Internet Movie Database

1996
Lists of 1996 films by country or language
1996 in Nigeria
1990s in Nigerian cinema